Lactarius pinguis is a member of the large milk-cap genus Lactarius in the order Russulales. Found in northern Thailand, it was described as new to science in 2010.

See also

List of Lactarius species

References

External links

pinguis
Fungi described in 2010
Fungi of Asia